was a mathematician who made important contributions to representation theory.

Career
He received his degrees from Tokyo University and Osaka University and held permanent positions at Osaka University and Nagoya University.  He had visiting positions at Princeton University, Illinois University, and Hamburg University. Nakayama's lemma, Nakayama algebras, Nakayama's conjecture and Murnaghan–Nakayama rule are named after him.

Selected works

 
 
 Tadasi Nakayama. A note on the elementary divisor theory in non-commutative domains. Bull. Amer. Math. Soc. 44 (1938) 719–723.  
 Tadasi Nakayama. A remark on representations of groups. Bull. Amer. Math. Soc. 44 (1938) 233–235.  
 Tadasi Nakayama. A remark on the sum and the intersection of two normal ideals in an algebra. Bull. Amer. Math. Soc. 46 (1940) 469–472.  
 Tadasi Nakayama and Junji Hashimoto. On a problem of G. Birkhoff . Proc. Amer. Math. Soc. 1 (1950) 141–142.  
 Tadasi Nakayama. Remark on the duality for noncommutative compact groups . Proc. Amer. Math. Soc. 2 (1951) 849–854.  
 Tadasi Nakayama. Orthogonality relation for Frobenius- and quasi-Frobenius-algebras . Proc. Amer. Math. Soc. 3 (1952) 183–195.  
 Tadasi Nakayama. Galois theory of simple rings . Trans. Amer. Math. Soc. 73 (1952) 276–292.  
 Masatosi Ikeda and Tadasi Nakayama. On some characteristic properties of quasi-Frobenius and regular rings . Proc. Amer. Math. Soc. 5 (1954) 15–19.

References

External links
 
 
 https://www.math.uni-bielefeld.de/~sek/collect/nakayama.html

1912 births
1964 deaths
Algebraists
20th-century Japanese mathematicians
Osaka University alumni
Academic staff of Osaka University
Academic staff of Nagoya University